is a Japanese regional bank that is headquartered in Tsuruoka, Yamagata Prefecture.

The bank is relatively small, even among Japanese regional banks; it operates primarily in Yamagata, though it also operates branches in Sendai, Tomiya, Fukushima, Akita in neighboring prefectures, as well as in the capital of Tokyo.  In a departure from traditional Japanese banking practices, Shogin, as the bank is also known, maintains full teller-supported services on the weekends and holidays at all its branches.

History

The Shonai Bank can trace its roots to the Meiji era when The 67th National Bank was established in 1878.  The bank has merged with other local institutions, adopting its present name in 1941 through a merger with the Kazama Bank, the Tsuruoka Bank, and the Dewa Bank.

On March 9, 2004, the government-sponsored Shoko Chukin Bank, a financial institution that provides credit and loans to small and medium-sized enterprises, announced that it would carry out limited business cooperation with the Shonai Bank in order to serve the small and medium enterprises of that area.

External links
 Shonai Bank
 Google Finance
  Hoovers Report

Companies based in Yamagata Prefecture
Regional banks of Japan
Companies listed on the Tokyo Stock Exchange
Banks established in 1878
Japanese companies established in 1878